Kampung Tanjung Aru is a village in Federal Territory of Labuan, Malaysia.

References 

 

Labuan